Walter S. "Rube" Manning (April 29, 1883 – April 23, 1930), was a Major League Baseball pitcher from 1907 to 1910.

Manning started his professional baseball career in 1906. He pitched for the Williamsport Millionaires of the Tri-State League for two years before being purchased by the New York Highlanders. In his first major league season, he went 13–16 with a 2.45 earned run average. Manning continued to pitch for New York through 1910. He then pitched in the minors until 1917.

References

External links

Obituary at The Deadball Era

1883 births
1930 deaths
Major League Baseball pitchers
Baseball players from Pennsylvania
New York Highlanders players
Williamsport Millionaires players
Reading Pretzels players
Allentown (minor league baseball) players
Atlantic City (minor league baseball) players
Toronto Maple Leafs (International League) players
Wilkes-Barre Barons (baseball) players